Natalia Malleus (née Malysheva; born on 23 January 1954 in Sevastopol) is a Russian-born Estonian politician. She has been member of XIV Riigikogu.

In 1976 she graduated from Tallinn University of Technology in industrial and civil engineering.

From 1978 until 1997, she worked at Eesti Televisioon, acting as a Russian language announcer and presenter as well as an editor. From 2004 until 2014, she worked as an editor and announcer for the Russian-language television channel Pervy Baltiysky Kanal (PBK).

Since 2015 she is a member of Estonian Centre Party.

References

Living people
1954 births
Estonian television personalities
Estonian Centre Party politicians
Members of the Riigikogu, 2019–2023
Women members of the Riigikogu
Tallinn University of Technology alumni
People from Sevastopol
Estonian people of Russian descent
21st-century Estonian women politicians